Tookey is a surname. People with that name include:
 Christopher Tookey (born 1950), English film critic
 Mark Tookey (born 1977), Australian former professional rugby league footballer
 Phyllis Margaret Tookey Kerridge (1901–1940), English chemist and physiologist
 Stacey Tookey (born 1976), Canadian choreographer and dancer
 Tim Tookey (born 1960), Canadian retired ice hockey player

See also
 Tookie (disambiguation)